State Highway 152 (abbreviated SH-152) is a state highway running through west-central Oklahoma. Along its route it serves three county seats: Sayre, Cordell, and Oklahoma City (which is also the state capital). Near its eastern end, it passes through the Oklahoma City suburb of Mustang. The easternmost  of the route is a freeway linking Will Rogers World Airport to the Interstate system. SH-152 has no lettered spur routes.

SH-152 was originally designated around 1927. It was initially numbered SH-41, and connected Sayre to Minco. SH-41 was extended east to Oklahoma City around 1934 and west to the Texas state line around 1938. The highway was renumbered to SH-152 in 1954.

Route description

SH-152 begins at the Texas state line in Roger Mills County. It runs just north of the county line, crossing State Highway 30, and continues east until it meets SH-6's northern terminus, where it turns toward the southeast, entering Beckham County. It straightens out to head through Sayre running east–west, where it meets both U.S. Highway 283 and Interstate 40. Six miles later it crosses State Highway 34 and six miles (10 km) after that it meets SH-6 again.

SH-152 then crosses into Washita County and intersects State Highway 44 and 42. It then meets US-183 in a roundabout in Cordell. East of Cordell, it has a  concurrency with the northern State Highway 54 and, after it splits off, it intersects State Highway 115.

Right after entering Caddo County, it has a  concurrency with State Highway 58, and then it meets State Highway 146 near Binger. At Binger, it begins to overlap U.S. Highway 281 and SH-8. (Located at this intersection is an abandoned Apco station, which was used in a scene from the movie "Rain Man"). North of Minco, it meets US-81. At this T-intersection, SH-37 heads south and SH-152 heads north.

After crossing the Canadian River into Canadian County, SH-152 splits off from US-81 in Union City. It passes the southern terminus of State Highway 92 in Mustang. In downtown Mustang, it overlaps SH-4.

In Oklahoma County, it heads northeast to connect to the Airport Road freeway, which provides access to Will Rogers World Airport, the main airport for Oklahoma City and most of central Oklahoma. SH-152 then ends at Interstate 44.

History

The first addition of any part of what is now SH-152 to the state highway system occurred between May 1, 1926, and November 1, 1927. Sometime between these dates, State Highway 41 was commissioned to run between US-66 in Sayre and SH-2 (now US-81) near Minco. SH-41 was extended east to Oklahoma City sometime between August 1933 and October 1935. SH-41's eastern terminus now fell at the intersection with US-62/277. The current western terminus was established between April 1938 and April 1939, when the highway was extended west from Sayre, through Sweetwater, to the Texas state line, where it connected to Texas's SH-152. On December 6, 1954, SH-41 in its entirety was renumbered to SH-152.

US-62 was moved to the Will Rogers Expressway (present day I-44 south of I-240) on September 4, 1963. SH-152 was extended over former US-62/277 to end at the intersection of S.W. 29th Street and May Avenue in Oklahoma City. At the time, this intersection carried SH-3 and SH-74. On March 5, 1979, the eastern terminus was pushed back a half-mile west, to the intersection of Interstate 44 and S.W. 29th.

The most recent alteration to SH-152 came on February 2, 2004. On this date, SH-152 was removed from Newcastle Boulevard and placed on the newly extended Airport Road freeway. The freeway previously carried no numbered route designation. This placed the highway's eastern terminus at its current location, and no changes have been made since.

Future
On August 2, 2021, the Oklahoma Transportation Commission approved an extension to the Interstate 240 designation to form a beltway around Oklahoma City. Starting in the existing eastern terminus, I-240 will run concurrent with I-40 to the Kickapoo Turnpike, then turn north and follow the Kickapoo Turnpike north to I-44 (the Turner Turnpike), then turn west along I-44 to the Kilpatrick Turnpike, following that road west and south to its current southern terminus at SH-152, then turning east along SH-152 and following that road east to I-44, which it will overlap until reaching the current western terminus of I-240. The designation must be approved by the American Association of State Highway and Transportation Officials (AASHTO) and the Federal Highway Administration (FHWA) to take effect.

SH-42

State Highway 42 is a short state highway in Washita County. SH-42 begins on the east edge of Dill City. It heads west along Orient Avenue through town, until it reaches Rambo Street. It then continues north on Rambo Street. The SH-42 designation then ends at SH-152. The SH-152 junction is SH-42's only intersection with another highway.

SH-42 was first added to the state highway system on July 20, 1939, at which time it had been graded, but not yet surfaced. At the time that SH-42 was commissioned, its northern terminus was at SH-41, which was later renumbered to SH-152. The highway first appeared on the 1944 state map.

Junction list

References

External links
SH-152 at OKHighways

152
Transportation in Oklahoma City
Transportation in Roger Mills County, Oklahoma
Transportation in Beckham County, Oklahoma
Transportation in Washita County, Oklahoma
Transportation in Caddo County, Oklahoma
Transportation in Grady County, Oklahoma
Transportation in Canadian County, Oklahoma
Transportation in Oklahoma County, Oklahoma